Latastia  longicaudata, also known as the southern long-tailed lizard or common long-tailed lizard, is a species of lizard found in Senegal, Mali, Sudan, Egypt, Ethiopia, Somalia, Yemen, Kenya, Tanzania, Cameroon, Central African Republic, Niger, Djibouti, and Mauritania.

References

Reptiles described in 1834
Latastia
Taxa named by Adolph Reuss